The 1941 Lancaster by-election was a parliamentary by-election for the British House of Commons constituency of Lancaster, Lancashire on 15 October 1941.

Vacancy
The by-election was caused by the elevation of the sitting Conservative MP, Rt Hon. Herwald Ramsbotham in August 1941. He was raised to the peerage as Baron Soulbury, of Soulbury in the County of Buckingham. He had been MP here since holding the seat in 1929.

Election history
Lancaster had been won by the Conservatives at every election since 1929 when they gained the seat from the Liberal, Robert Parkinson Tomlinson. The result at the last General election was as follows;

Candidates
The local Conservatives selected first time candidate, 30-year-old Lt. Fitzroy MacLean. Before the war, he worked as a diplomat. In 1939 he enlisted as a private in the Queen's Own Cameron Highlanders. He was soon promoted to lance corporal and was commissioned in 1941.

The Liberals had selected 63-year-old Lt-Col. William Charles Ross to contest a general election expected to occur in 1939–40. He had contested Manchester Withington in 1935. He was retired from the Indian Medical Service. Before the war, the Labour party had selected Albert Edward Victor Ainsworth Farrer as prospective candidate. At the declaration of war, the Conservative, Liberal and Labour parties had agreed an electoral truce which meant that when a by-election occurred, the party that was defending the seat would not be opposed by an official candidate from the other two parties. When the Labour and Liberal parties joined the Coalition government in May 1940, it was agreed that any by-election candidate defending a government seat would receive a letter of endorsement jointly signed by all the party leaders. This was enough to persuade Farrer, the Labour candidate, to withdraw. However, Ross, the Liberal candidate, decided to put his name forward.

Although there was no Labour candidate, 53-year-old Fenner Brockway stood as candidate for the Independent Labour Party, who were not part of the electoral truce. Brockway stood for Parliament several times, including in 1924 in Westminster Abbey. In 1929, he was elected Member of Parliament for Leyton East as a Labour Party candidate. In 1931 Brockway lost his seat and the following year he disaffiliated from the Labour Party along with the rest of the ILP. He stood unsuccessfully for the ILP in the 1934 West Ham Upton by-election and in Norwich in the 1935 election. The ILP were opposed to British participation in the Second World War, a position that Brockway did not share, though he served as Chair of the Central Board for Conscientious objectors.

Campaign
Polling day was set for 15 October 1941. When nominations closed, it was to reveal a three horse race.

MacLean received a joint letter of endorsement from all the leaders of the parties in the coalition.

Result

Aftermath
The result at the following General election;

See also
 List of United Kingdom by-elections
 United Kingdom by-election records

References

1941 elections in the United Kingdom
By-elections to the Parliament of the United Kingdom in Lancashire constituencies
1941 in England
Politics of Lancaster
1940s in Lancashire